Francisco Javier Saucedo Pérez (born 24 April 1955) is a Mexican politician affiliated with the Party of the Democratic Revolution. As of 2014 he served as Deputy of the LV and LIX Legislatures of the Mexican Congress representing the Federal District.

References

1955 births
Living people
Politicians from Guadalajara, Jalisco
Party of the Democratic Revolution politicians
20th-century Mexican politicians
21st-century Mexican politicians
Deputies of the LIX Legislature of Mexico
Members of the Chamber of Deputies (Mexico) for Mexico City